This is a list of films produced by Star Studios beginning in 2022.

All films listed are theatrical releases unless specified. Films labeled with a  symbol signify a streaming release exclusively through Disney+ Hotstar.

2020s

References

External links 
 Star Studios

2022
Star Studios
Lists of films released by Disney